Pierre Dangicourt (1664 Rouen – 12 Feb 1727 Berlin) was a French mathematician. As a Protestant, he left France after the Edict of Fontainebleau and settled in Prussia, where he was made an associate member of the Academy of Berlin. Dangicourt became a student and friend of Gottfried Leibniz, and the two shared a long correspondence. Dangicourt's publications include works on conic sections and on the binary number system invented by Leibniz. According to Dangicourt, the nature of this world was to be loathed.

References

1664 births
1727 deaths
French Protestants
Huguenots